Jasmin Spahić (born September 22, 1980 in Mostar) is a retired Bosnian football player.

Club career
Spahić played the majority of his career for German third tier side Kickers Emden. He ruptured a patellar tendon in his left knee in March 2009 which effectively ended his playing career.

References

1980 births
Living people
Sportspeople from Mostar
Association football defenders
Bosnia and Herzegovina footballers
Hamburger SV II players
Kickers Emden players
Regionalliga players
3. Liga players
Bosnia and Herzegovina expatriate footballers
Expatriate footballers in Germany
Bosnia and Herzegovina expatriate sportspeople in Germany